Revolutionary Front may refer to:
Cuban Democratic Revolutionary Front
Democratic Revolutionary Front for the Liberation of Arabistan
Democratic Revolutionary Front-New Alternative
Islamic Revolutionary Front or Islamic Inquilab Mahaz
Karnataka Revolutionary Front or Karnataka Kranti Ranga
Krantikari Morcha or Revolutionary Front
Left Revolutionary Front (Portugal)
National Revolutionary Front or Barisan Revolusi Nasional
National Revolutionary Front for the Liberation of Haiti
People's Revolutionary Front (Marxist−Leninist−Maoist)
Popular Revolutionary Front for the Liberation of Palestine
Revolutionary Front for an Independent East Timor (Fretilin)
Sikkim Krantikari Morcha or Sikkim Revolutionary Front
Sudan Revolutionary Front
Syria Revolutionaries Front
United Revolutionary Front of Bhutan
University Students' African Revolutionary Front
Revolutionary Front (Sweden)

See also
Afar Revolutionary Democratic Unity Front
Eelam People's Revolutionary Liberation Front
Krantikari Mukti Morcha or Revolutionary Liberation Front
Krantikari Manuwadi Morcha or Revolutionary Manuvadi Front
Revolution
Revolutionary and Popular Indoamericano Front
Revolutionary Antifascist Patriotic Front
Revolutionary Democratic Front
Revolutionary Democratic Front (2006)
Revolutionary Left Front (Bolivia)
Revolutionary United Front
Revolutionary Youth Front